Erik Lage Rahm (born 27 January 1980) is a Swedish politician for the Green Party (Miljöpartiet). He was a Member of Parliament between November 2007 and October 2010, during which he worked with defence issues in the Defence Committee (försvarsutskottet) and the Committee on Foreign Affairs (utrikesutskottet).

References

External links
 Miljöpartiet de Gröna – Lage Rahm
 lage.nu – Lage Rahm
 Lage Rahm (mp) – Riksdagen

1980 births
Living people
Members of the Riksdag from the Green Party
Members of the Riksdag 2006–2010
21st-century Swedish politicians